The Gondi languages are a subgroup of the indigenous family that includes Gondi and related languages. Gondi proper is the most widely spoken language, with over 10 million speakers. Other languages in this subgroup include Muria, Madiya, and Koya. It is undetermined whether Pardhan is a separate language or a dialect of Gondi, although current fieldwork suggests it is a dialect. Khirwar is a poorly-attested language spoken by people in the general Gond area, and so is assumed to be related to Gondi.

References 

Dravidian languages